Arturo Néstor Alonso Tellechea (born 6 August 1983) is a Spanish sailor.

Arturo Alonso sails in the 49er class together with his older brother, Federico Alonso. They won the silver medal at the 2008 European Championships, the gold medal at the 2009 ISAF Sailing World Cup, and the bronze medal at the 2015 World Championships.

Notes

References

External links
 
 
 
 

1983 births
Living people
Spanish male sailors (sport)
49er class sailors
Real Club Astur de Regatas sailors
Sportspeople from Gijón
Sportspeople from Buenos Aires
Argentine emigrants to Spain
Argentine male sailors (sport)